Cave Austin and Co., Ltd was a chain of grocery stores and cafés in the southeast of England. During its seventy year history it grew to some fifty branches in Kent, Surrey, Sussex, and much of South East London. Cafés were in several seaside towns such as Deal in Kent and Hastings in Sussex.

History 
Cave Austin and Co., Ltd was officially incorporated as a public company in 1896, when several separate concerns (including tea importers, wine and spirit merchants, and grocery shops) agreed to unite for mutual benefit under combined management. The inaugural board of directors were C.H. Cave, A.J. Cave, Alfred Austin, Charles Stamp (who had his own provision business), E Underwood, James McCabe, and E.J. Mansfield. There were two sides to the business: Grocery Stores and Cafés.  The wholesale tea business (represented by the former Lindoo Valley Tea Company) was abandoned in 1903 and an intensive campaign was started to popularize roasted coffee with all coffee roasted, blended, and ground in the company premises by their own staff. By the 1930's the focus was on developing the company as a 'high-class' grocery chain

Cave's Cafés 
Early in its history the company established a chain of cafés known as Cave's Oriental Cafés with a distinctive oriental decor. They had premises in Brighton (1896) Eastbourne (1899), Folkestone (1900), Dover (1903), Ramsgate (1904), Hastings (1905), Canterbury (1905), Cliftonville (1907), Hythe (1909), Broadstairs (1911), and Deal (1912). The chain was controlled and developed by Mr C.H. Cave. After World War I Cave's Cafés were further developed and modernised by his nephew, Frank Cave.

Grocery stores and war damage 

From 1932, after Mr C. H. Cave's retirement, the Grocery branches were developed in London, Kent, and Surrey under the Chairmanship of Charles Stamp (founder Secretary and Director). Soon after the death of Charles Stamp in 1935, Frank Cave was elected Chairman.

During World War II the company suffered greatly with bomb damage: the warehouse in Lewisham, South London was bombed twice, and in 1943 the Eastbourne café was destroyed. The following year Hastings and St.Leonards  branches were totally destroyed, and the Blackheath Grocery Store was badly damaged in 1945  by a V2 rocket.

Despite the damage expansion continued, with new premises in Dorking, Beckenham, Mottingham, Worcester Park, Shirley, Rotherfield, Petts Wood and Crofton.

In 1950 Frank Cave died and was replaced as Chairman by Charles Alfred Stamp (son of Charles Stamp). Expansion continued including premises at St John's Wood, Downham, and Hayes, Bromley in 1952 - the company's first self-service store . In 1956 a Mobile Grocery Shop equipped with cold cabinet was put on the road. In 1954 a new Warehouse was built in Lewisham which included offices, coffee roasting department, cold store, ham cooking department, wine and spirit stores and sale room. At the same time the company was developing its own label lines.

"Sixty years of trading" 

In 1956 the company published a booklet, 'Sixty Years of Trading. A History of Cave Austin and Co., Ltd, Cave's Cafés. 1896-1956”. In it was recorded the following statistics: over 400 staff, 24 vans (travelling over 190,000 miles a year), over 30 tons of coffee roasted per annum, 5000 gammons cooked per annum, 92 tons of butter, 100 tons of margarine, 54 tons of tea sold and 2,600 tons of food delivered from warehouse to branches. There were 19 licensed branches with a large range of French wines, and a range of "fancy" groceries such as "okra, puppodums, lychees, Bombay duck, bamboo shoots" (food Rationing in the United Kingdom had only just ended in 1954).   At this time the Board of Directors were Charles Stamp, Dudley Stamp, Barry Hartnell Stamp, Stanley Rogers and Leonard Elwood. The booklet ends: "The directors are confident that sixty years of progress will be followed by yet another period of similar development."

Competition and takeover 
Charles Alfred Stamp  was subsequently succeeded as chairman in 1963 by his son, Barry Stamp. By this time, it was clear that the unmatched range, value, and buying power of the big Supermarkets, notably Tesco and Sainsbury's, was squeezing the smaller operators. Even though Cave Austin by this time had 40 Grocery stores, they were unable to effectively compete in an aggressively competitive and expanding market. Barry  Stamp was the company's last Chairman and negotiated its takeover in 1963 by Burton, Son and Sanders of Ipswich. In 1966 the company was sold once more to merge with Moores Stores and the name 'Cave Austin' disappeared.

In the 21st century a wine bar called 'Cave Austin' opened in Blackheath, taking its name from a floor mosaic still at the entrance to the premises. Both the wine bar and mosaic have now gone.

References 

(Most Cave Austin and Co., Ltd. records are held in the London Metropolitan Archives  Use reference codes in their SEARCH engine)

  London Metropolitan Archives Collection Catalogue  LMA/4758/A/01/001: 'REPORT OF THE DIRECTORS, STATEMENT OF ACCOUNTS AND BALANCE SHEET FOR 52 WEEKS ENDED 30TH SEPTEMBER, 1962'
 London Metropolitan Archives Collection Catalogue  LMA/4758/B/01: Eleven trade magazine articles on Cave Austin, up to 1966
 London Metropolitan Archives Collection Catalogue  LMA/4758/C/01/001: Cave Austin Social and Dinner events.
 London Metropolitan Archives Collection Catalogue LMA/4758/C/01/002: Christmas booklets 1925 - 1937. Sent to staff with printed letter by Charles A. Stamp (later Chairman and Managing director). Each with a card cover with a woodcut by his sister Bertha C. Stamp. They contain: a letter by Charles H Stamp wishing his employees a 'the Happiest of Xmases and a spirit of Cheerful Optimism of the New Year'; a round up of events; an overview of future events; a photographed portrait (including C.H. Stamp, A.J. Cave and competition winners); a poem.
 London Metropolitan Archives Collection Catalogue   LMA/4758/C/01/001/002: 'Dinner in honour of Mr. Charles A. Stamp, F.C.S. on his retirement as Chairman of Cave Austin & Company Ltd. On Tuesday, 5 February 1963' Dinner menu.

External links 
 AIM25 text-only browsing: London Metropolitan Archives: CAVE AUSTIN AND COMPANY LIMITED London Metropolitan Archives
 Sixty years of trading: a history of Cave Austin and Co., Ltd. Cave's Cafes. 1896-1956 Sixty Years of Trading
 DEW167 Shop Front Cave, Austin & Co, Ltd, Grocers, Sidcup 1900 Photo from the London Borough of Bexley website of Cave Austin Sidcup shopfront.
 Shops in Eltham High Street Photo from London Picture Archive of Cave Austin Eltham.
 f6658 - Old photo of Fire -  Photo of fire at Cave Austin Bexhill, 1909,  from 'Gravelroots' Fire Service archive.
 Castle Street - Hastings UK Photo Archive Photo of Hastings shop, 1966.

1896 establishments in the United Kingdom
Grocers
Shops in London
Coffeehouses and cafés in the United Kingdom